Johan Sætre (born 5 January 1952) is a Norwegian former ski jumper.

Career
An active ski jumper in the 1970s and 1980s, he won ten Norwegian ski jumping championships (Normal hill: 1974–1977, 1979, and 1980; Large hill: 1976, 1977, 1980, and 1982). He is the most-winning ski jumper of all time in the Norwegian Championships, but individual success eluded him in major international championships. At the 1982 FIS Nordic World Ski Championships in Oslo, Sætre won a gold in the team large hill competition. His best finish in an Olympic or World Cup competition was a win in 1981 at Gstaad, Switzerland.

Sætre earned the Holmenkollen medal in 1981.

World Cup

Standings

Wins

External links

Holmenkollen medalists - click Holmenkollmedaljen for downloadable pdf file 
Norwegian ski jumping champions since 1933 

1952 births
Holmenkollen medalists
Living people
Norwegian male ski jumpers
Olympic ski jumpers of Norway
Ski jumpers at the 1976 Winter Olympics
Ski jumpers at the 1980 Winter Olympics
People from Trysil
FIS Nordic World Ski Championships medalists in ski jumping
Sportspeople from Innlandet
20th-century Norwegian people